Mary Evelyn Wood (1900 – 1978) was a politician and nurse in the Cayman Islands. She was the first woman elected to the Legislative Assembly of the Cayman Islands.

The daughter of Charles and Julietta Wood, she started a small school in her father's home while she was in her early 20s. Wood trained as a nurse and worked in her community as a nurse, visiting new and expectant mothers and sick persons. She provided care to victims of a typhoid epidemic in the late 1930s.

Wood was one of many women who signed a 1957 petition in support of women's suffrage; women gained the vote in 1959. In the same year, she joined the National Democratic Party, serving as treasurer. In 1962, she was elected to the legislative assembly for Bodden Town district. She was not the first woman to serve, however, as Annie Huldah Bodden had been appointed the previous year.

Wood was also the first woman in the Cayman Islands to serve on a jury.

In 1965, Wood received the Cayman Islands Certificate and Badge of Honour for her service to the community.

References 

1900 births
1978 deaths
National Democratic Party (Cayman Islands) politicians
Members of the Parliament of the Cayman Islands
Caymanian women in politics
20th-century British women politicians
National Heroes of the Cayman Islands
Women's rights in the Cayman Islands